Brachychiton albidus is a tree of the genus Brachychiton native to Queensland, Australia. It was described in 1988.

Notes

References

albidus
Malvales of Australia
Trees of Australia
Ornamental trees
Drought-tolerant trees
Plants described in 1988